Peter Dawson may refer to:

People 
Peter Dawson (bass-baritone) (1882–1961), Australian bass-baritone who gained worldwide renown in the 1920s and 1930s
Peter Dawson, chief winemaker of the Hardy Wine Company 
Peter Dawson (politician) (1892–1963), Canadian politician
Peter Dawson (cyclist) (born 1982), Australian Olympic cyclist
Peter Dawson (golfer) (born 1950), English golfer
Peter Dawson (cricketer) (1946–2012), former English cricketer
Peter Dawson (swimmer) (born 1957), Australian Olympic swimmer
Peter Dawson (priest) (1929–2013), Archdeacon of Norfolk
Peter Dawson (trade unionist) (1940–2005), Welsh trade union leader

Characters 
Peter Dawson, character in the film Heathers, played by Jeremy Applegate
Peter Dawson, character in the Rising Stars comic book